Janine Marie Szpara (born January 11, 1967) is an American former soccer player and coach who played as a goalkeeper, making six appearances for the United States women's national team.

Career
In college, Szpara played for the Colorado College Tigers from 1985 to 1988, with the team's best result in 1986 as NCAA runners-up. She was selected as an NSCAA First-Team All-American in all four seasons, and in 1988 was the ISAA Goalkeeper of the Year. She was also included in the Senior Recognition Team in 1988. In total, she made 78 appearances for the Tigers. She holds the record for the most shutouts at the school, with 46 during her career, along with the best save percentage and fewest average goals conceded.

Szpara made her international debut for the United States on July 20, 1986 in the Mundialito against China PR. In total, she made six appearances for the U.S., earning her final cap on July 11, 1987 in the 1987 North America Cup against Norway.

In club soccer, Szpara played for Shiroki FC Serena and Takarazuka Bunnys Ladies SC in Japan from 1995 to 1999, and was selected to the league's All-Star Team in 1998. She also played in the WPSL for the Norcal Shockwaves in 1997 and Foothill FC in 2001. She played for the Bay Area CyberRays during the 2001 WUSA season, replacing the injured Jen Mead, with the team ultimately winning the WUSA championship. She made one appearance for the CyberRays during the season.

Szpara later began to work as a coach, holding a U.S. Soccer 'A' license and primarily focusing on goalkeeper training. She worked as an assistant for the Stanford Cardinal from 1989 to 1999 and the California Golden Bears in 1992. While playing in Japan, she also began to coach at Shiroki FC Serena. After returning to the U.S., she worked as an assistant for the Cornell Big Red in 2000, Santa Clara Broncos in 2002, San Jose State Spartans in 2003, and Warner Pacific Knights as an associate head coach from 2004 to 2006. From 2008 to 2011, she worked as an assistant for the Portland State Vikings, before becoming the head coach of the Portland Rain club team, where she remained until 2012, and Clackamas Cougars collegiate team in 2011. In 2018, Szpara coached at St. Mary's Academy in Portland, Oregon, working as the assistant for the varsity team and head coach of the junior varsity team. In youth soccer, she worked as a coach for the Olympic Development Program in California from 1989 to 1992, and in Oregon from 2006 to 2017. She was the coordinator for the Cornell Youth Camp from 2002 to 2004, and worked at Oregon Youth Soccer as well as Tualatin Hills United Soccer Club, where she was an assistant director and the coach of various boys' youth teams. She has also worked in various roles at the youth clubs Portland Spartans FC/FC Mulhouse Portland and Portland Thorns Academy.

Szpara has traveled to coach youth soccer as a sports envoy for the U.S. State Department, having led clinics in Guatemala, Indonesia, Malaysia, Mexico, Singapore, and Vietnam.

Szpara was inducted into the Colorado College Athletic Hall of Fame in 1995. She was also inducted into the school's Hall of Fame in 2006 as a member of the 1986 women's soccer team. In 2017, she was inducted into the Colorado Springs Sports Hall of Fame.

Personal life
Though born in Chicago, Szpara grew up in San Jose, California, and attended Valley Christian High School. She graduated with a Bachelor of Arts in history from Colorado College in 1989.

Career statistics

International

References

1967 births
Living people
Soccer players from Chicago
Soccer players from San Jose, California
American women's soccer players
American women's soccer coaches
United States women's international soccer players
American expatriate women's soccer players
American expatriate sportspeople in Japan
Expatriate women's footballers in Japan
American expatriate soccer coaches
Women's association football goalkeepers
Colorado College Tigers women's soccer players
Shiroki FC Serena players
Bunnys Kyoto SC players
San Jose CyberRays players
Nadeshiko League players
Women's Premier Soccer League players
Women's United Soccer Association players
Stanford Cardinal women's soccer coaches
California Golden Bears women's soccer coaches
Cornell Big Red women's soccer coaches
Santa Clara Broncos women's soccer coaches
San Jose State Spartans women's soccer coaches
Portland State Vikings women's soccer coaches
Warner Pacific University people